The Wenatchee World is the leading daily newspaper in Wenatchee and East Wenatchee, Washington, United States. Serving Chelan, Douglas and other North Central Washington counties since 1905, The Wenatchee World prints on its front page that it is "Published in the Apple Capital of the World and the Buckle of the Power Belt of the Great Northwest".

History
The World Publishing Company was founded in 1905 by businessmen C.A. Briggs and Nat Ament. On July 3, 1905, the company published the first issue of The Wenatchee Daily World. The issue included a pledge "to be an active, helping factor in not alone the city of Wenatchee and the county of Chelan, but also in our neighbor counties of Douglas and Okanogan." The newspaper was a forceful proponent for economic development of the Columbia Basin and the area the newspaper called North Central Washington.

Two years later, the newspaper was purchased by Rufus Woods and his twin brother Ralph. Rufus published the newspaper while Ralph, a Tacoma attorney, provided legal advice to the fledgling paper. Later, their cousin Warren Woods joined the company to handle the newspaper's finances.

Rufus Woods and the Daily World became integrally involved in the 23-year battle for Coulee Dam and the Columbia Basin Irrigation Project. Woods wrote the first story about the proposal in 1918, which was followed by hundreds of articles about the project and editorials promoting the concept.

Upon Rufus Woods' death in 1950, his son Wilfred became editor and publisher of the newspaper and continued to promote economic development in North Central Washington. Warren Woods' son, Robert, was the newspaper's editor and later editorial page writer. In the 1960s and 1970s, the Daily World (the name was shortened to The Wenatchee World in 1971) continued to promote regional development, sponsoring a series of trips through Canada and Alaska to study the region's energy resources.

In 1997, Wilfred Woods turned the management of the company over to his son, Rufus Woods. The newspaper was owned by the families of Wilfred and Robert Woods until March 2018, when Rufus Woods announced that he sold the newspaper to Wick Communications. All of the employees at that time were offered jobs with the new owners.

References

Publications established in 1905
Newspapers published in Washington (state)
1905 establishments in Washington (state)